Owsley may refer to:

 Owsley (surname), a surname
 Owsley Stanley (1935–2011), also known as Owsley or Bear, "underground" LSD chemist and early Grateful Dead soundman, grandson of Augustus
 Owsley (musician), the stage name of Will Owsley, American singer-songwriter and guitarist
 Owsley (album), eponymous 1999 album by the singer-songwriter
 Owsley, Missouri, an unincorporated community in Missouri, United States
 Owsley County, Kentucky, a county in Kentucky, United States

See also
 Ouseley
 Owlsley, the mascot of the Florida Atlantic University: see Florida Atlantic Owls#Traditions